Sergio Romano (born 7 July 1929) is an Italian diplomat, writer, journalist, and historian. He is a columnist for the newspaper Corriere della Sera. Romano is also a former Italian ambassador to Moscow.

Biography
Born in Vicenza, he grew up between Milan and Genoa in a middle-class business family. He graduated from the liceo classico Cesare Beccaria of Milan, then began working as a journalist. In 1952, he obtained a degree in Law at the University of Milan, but he never finished his studies in Political Science at the University of Genoa before graduation. He travelled to European capitals (Paris, London, Vienna) recently emerged from the war, which directed him to a diplomatic career. He joined the Foreign Ministry in 1954, and after four years spent in Rome he was assigned to the seat in London, where he remained until 1964. He returned to Rome to assist in the Cabinet Minister Saragat; when the latter was elected President of the Republic he followed him to the Quirinale, assigned to the General Secretariat of the Presidency.

From 1968 to 1977, he was in Paris and, after being general manager of cultural relations and Ambassador to NATO (1983–85), he concluded his diplomatic career in Moscow, in the then Soviet Union. He talks about this experience in the book Memoirs of a Conservative (2002), concise portrait of the bureaucratic class and Italian diplomacy (and not only) in the era of the Cold War.
   
He became a commentator for a number of Italian newspapers and magazines (la Stampa, il Corriere della Sera, Limes, Il Mulino), the editor of a historical series for the publisher Corbaccio. He has also taught at the University of California, Harvard, the University of Pavia, University of Sassari and Bocconi University in Milan. He is also President of the General Prize Committee of the Balzan Foundation and a member of the Scientific Committee for the magazine Geopolitica

In 1993, he won the "Pisa National Literary Prize" in the non-fiction section. In 2010, he won the prize "È giornalismo", when he affirmed that he had been ambassador for years without having a bachelor's degree in Political Science but only in Law (to enter the diplomatic service in Italy is required a degree in Political Sciences or in Law or in Economics). In 2010, he spoke at the 2010 Ambrosetti Forum.

Honors 
 Order of Merit of the Italian Republic 1st Class / Knight Grand Cross – 27 December 1987

Publications
1977 – Histoire de l'Italie du Risorgimento à nos jours (Editions du Seuil; ed. it. Storia d'Italia dal Risorgimento ai giorni nostri, Mondadori, 1978)
1977 – "La quarta sponda. La guerra di Libia, 1911/1912", Casa Editrice Bompiani, 1977, pag. 270 
1979 – "Giuseppe Volpi. Industria e finanza tra Giolitti e Mussolini",1979
1989 – La Russia in bilico (Il Mulino)
1991 – La politica estera italiana (1860-1985), scritto con Richard J.B. Bosworth (Il Mulino)
1991 – Disegno di storia d'Europa dal 1789 al 1989 (Longanesi)
1992 – I falsi protocolli. Il "complotto ebraico" dalla Russia di Nicola II a oggi (Corbaccio)
1993 – L'Italia scappata di mano (Longanesi)
1993 – Viaggi intorno alla Russia (La Stampa)
1994 – Tra due Repubbliche. L'anno di Berlusconi e le prospettive dell'Italia (Arnoldo Mondadori Editore)
1994 – FINIS ITALIAE – Declino e morte dell'ideologia risorgimentale – Perché gli italiani si disprezzano – (All'insegna del pesce d'oro)
1995 – Lo scambio ineguale. Italia e Stati Uniti da Wilson a Clinton (Laterza)
1995 – La storia sul comodino. Personaggi, viaggi, memorie (Greco e Greco)
1995 – Storia d'Italia dall'Unità ai nostri giorni
1995 – Cinquant'anni di storia mondiale. La pace e le guerre da Yalta ai giorni nostri (Longanesi)
1995 – I falsi protocolli. Il "complotto ebraico" dalla Russia di Nicola II ai nostri giorni, (Nuova edizione con l'aggiunta di un capitolo sugli ebrei invisibili dell'Europa centrorientale ), Editrice TEA, Milano 
1996 – Le Italie parallele. Perché l'Italia non riesce a diventare un paese moderno (Longanesi)
1996 – Passando a Nord-Ovest, scritto con Aldo A. Mola (Bastogi)
1997 – Lettera a un amico ebreo (TEA)
1997 – Giuseppe Volpi. Industria e finanza tra Giolitti e Mussolini (Marsilio)
1998 – Confessioni di un revisionista (Ponte alle Grazie)
1998 – Storia d'Italia dal Risorgimento ai nostri giorni (TEA)
1999 – Attraverso il secolo (Libri Scheiwiller)
2000 – Giolitti (Bompiani)
2000 – L'Italia negli anni della Guerra Fredda. Dal piano Marshall alla caduta del Muro (Ponte alle Grazie)
2000 – Mussolini (biografia per immagini) (Longanesi)
2000 – I luoghi della Storia (Rizzoli)
2000 – Crispi (Bompiani, ; ristampa)
2001 – I volti della storia. I protagonisti e le questioni aperte del nostro passato (Rizzoli)
2001 – La pace perduta 1989-2001 (Longanesi)
2002 – Lettera a un amico ebreo. Edizione ampliata (Longanesi)
2002 – Memorie di un conservatore (TEA)
2002 – Guida alla politica estera italiana. Da Badoglio a Berlusconi (Rizzoli)
2003 – I confini della storia (Rizzoli)
2003 – Il rischio americano (Longanesi)
2004 – Giovanni Gentile. Un filosofo al potere negli anni del Regime (Rizzoli)
2004 – Anatomia del terrore. Colloquio con Guido Olimpio (Rizzoli)
2004 – Europa, storia di un'idea. Dall'impero all'unione (Longanesi)
2005 – La quarta sponda: La guerra di Libia 1911-1912 (Longanesi, ; ristampa 1ª edizione Bompiani 1977)
2005 – Libera Chiesa. Libero Stato? (Longanesi)
2007 – Saremo moderni? Diario di un anno (Longanesi)
2007 – Con gli occhi dell'Islam (Longanesi)
2008 – I falsi protocolli (Editore TEA collana TEA storica)
2009 – Indro Montanelli. I conti con me stesso. Diari 1957-1978'' (Rizzoli)
2009 – Storia di Francia, dalla comune a Sarkozy. (Longanesi)
2011 – L'Italia disunita (Longanesi)
2012 – with Beda Romano – La Chiesa contro. Dalla sessualità all'eutanasia tutti i no all'Europa moderna (Longanesi,)

See also
 Ministry of Foreign Affairs (Italy)
 Foreign relations of Italy

References

1929 births
Living people
People from Vicenza
20th-century Italian historians
Italian columnists
Italian male non-fiction writers
Ambassadors of Italy to the Soviet Union
University of Milan alumni
Italian diplomats
20th-century diplomats
Knights Grand Cross of the Order of Merit of the Italian Republic
21st-century Italian historians